Fiat is an Italian automobile manufacturer.

Fiat or FIAT may also refer to:

Organizations

Fiat industrial group
 Fiat Aviazione, the former aircraft manufacturing division of Fiat
 Fiat Ferroviaria, the former rail division of Fiat, now part of Alstom
 Fiat Industrial, the part of Fiat not directly related to automobiles, now part of CNH Industrial
 Fiat Industrial Vehicles, the former industrial vehicles division of Fiat
 Fiat S.p.A., the parent holding company that was merged in 2014 into Fiat Chrysler
 Fiat Chrysler Automobiles
 Fiat Group Automobiles, the subsidiary of FCA grouping automotive manufacturing activities
 Fiat (cycling team), a French professional cycling team that existed in 1978 and 1979
 Fiat France (cycling team), a Belgian professional cycling team that existed in 1977
 Fiat India Automobiles, the Indian subsidiary of FGA
 Fiat Professional, the subsidiary producing Fiat branded light commercial vehicles
 Fiat Powertrain Technologies, the subsidiary of FCA manufacturing engines
 Fiat Trattori, the historical Fiat company producing tractors, now New Holland Agriculture

Other organizations
 Felony Investigative Assistance Team, Illinois, US
 Field Information Agency; Technical (FIAT), 1945-1947 US Army agency for exploiting German scientific methods

Places
 Fiat, Indiana, a town in the US
 Fiat, Kansas, an unincorporated community in the US
 Fiat Tagliero Building, in Asmara, Eritrea

Other uses
 Fiat (policy debate), a theoretical construct in policy debate
 Fiat justitia, a means of granting leave to appeal by exercise of the royal prerogative
 Fiat money, currency issued by government
 Military fiat, process where a decision is made and enforced by military means without participation of political elements

People with the surname 
 Amos Fiat (born 1956), Israeli computer scientist
 Caroline Fiat (born 1977), French politician
 Kyle Fiat (born 1983), American lacrosse player

See also
 Fiat Lux (disambiguation)

Disambiguation pages with surname-holder lists